Hesston College is a private college in Hesston, Kansas, United States. It is associated with the Mennonite Church USA and has an enrollment of about 400 students who typically come from about 30 states and 15 other countries.

History
In 1909, the Mennonite Church founded the Hesston College, because many of the early settlers were Mennonite farmers.

In 1981, the Dyck Arboretum of the Plains was founded at the college.

Educational facilities

The main  Hesston campus consists of 12 buildings, including two residential dormitories, an administration building, library, a number of academic buildings, and two gymnasiums.  It also has a baseball diamond, a softball field, soccer field, two racquetball courts, a weight room, and four tennis courts.

The Dyck Arboretum of the Plains is a  Arboretum located blocks from the main campus.

The aviation program has facilities at the Newton City-County Airport east of Newton, Kansas.

The Nursing program, in addition to facilities on the main campus, has affiliations with local hospitals, including Newton Medical Center and Prairie View Mental Health Center in Newton, Schowalter Villa in Hesston, and Via Christi-St. Francis Campus, Via Christi-St. Joseph Campus, and Wesley Medical Center in Wichita.

Athletics
The official mascot for the Hesston College athletic teams is the Larks. The Larks have 13 teams: baseball, softball, men's and women's cross country, men's and women's basketball, volleyball, men's and women's soccer, track and field, and golf which was added for the academic year 2016–2017. Hesston  participates in the NJCAA, and was given full membership in the Kansas Jayhawk Community College Conference in 2018.

Notable alumni
 Theodore Epp, Christian clergyman, writer, and radio evangelist. 
 John A. Hostetler, author, educator, and leading scholar of Amish and Hutterite societies.
 Jesse B. Martin, Canadian bishop and peace activist
 Katie Sowers, first openly LGBTQ coach in the NFL.

References

Further reading
 A School on the Prairie: A Centennial History of Hesston College, 1909–2009; John Sharp; 2009; .
 A Pillar of Cloud the Story of Hesston College; Mary Miller; 1959; ASIN B000JEMKR8.

External links

 
  Hesston College (Hesston, Kansas, USA) at Global Anabaptist Mennonite Encyclopedia Online

Universities and colleges affiliated with the Mennonite Church
Private universities and colleges in Kansas
Education in Harvey County, Kansas
Educational institutions established in 1909
Buildings and structures in Harvey County, Kansas
1909 establishments in Kansas
Two-year colleges in the United States
NJCAA athletics